L'Atelier de Joël Robuchon is the name of French gourmet restaurants, located worldwide, owned by chef Joël Robuchon. The restaurants serve French haute cuisine in a stylized environment. Many of the seats are arranged to overlook the meal preparation in the kitchen. L'Atelier translates to "workshop," and the term atelier is commonly used to refer to the workshop of an artist in the fine or decorative arts.

In 2012, the Paris location of L’Atelier de Joël Robuchon in Saint-Germain-des-Prés was voted 12th best in the world in Restaurant magazine's Top 50.

Notable chefs who have worked at the ateliers include Lebanese writer Tara Khattar.

Locations 
L'Atelier de Joël Robuchon is present worldwide:

Past locations: Bangkok, London, Monaco, Montreal, New York City.

See also 
 List of restaurants in the Las Vegas Valley

References

External links 
 Official website
 L'atelier of Joël Robuchon: the artistry of a master chef and his protégés, Van Nostrand Reinhold (1997)

French restaurants
Michelin Guide starred restaurants in Japan
Michelin Guide starred restaurants in France
Michelin Guide starred restaurants in Hong Kong
Michelin Guide starred restaurants in the United States
Michelin Guide starred restaurants in the United Kingdom